Westhill may refer to:

Places
Westhill, Aberdeenshire, a small town approximately 7.5 miles due west of the city of Aberdeen in Scotland
Westhill, Highland, a community area approximately 4 miles to the east of Inverness in the Scottish Highlands, and 2.5 miles west of Culloden
Westhill (Austin, Texas), listed on the National Register of Historic Places in Travis County, Texas

Schools
 Westhill High School (Connecticut) in Stamford, Connecticut
 Westhill Senior High School in Syracuse, New York
 West Hill School - Stalybridge in Stalybridge, NW, UK
 Westhill Institute in Mexico City

Other
 West Hill railway station, Kerala, India